Öznur is a Turkish female given name. Notable people with the name include:

 Öznur Kızıl (born 1991), Turkish wushu practitioner
 Öznur Polat (born 1987), Turkish curler and curling coach
 Küplüceli Öznur (1526-1628), Ottoman divan poet

Turkish unisex given names